Luis-Augusto García is a Mexican tennis player.  In 1966 and 1967 he reached the third round of the US Open.

References

External links
 
 

Year of birth missing (living people)
Place of birth missing (living people)
Mexican male tennis players
Living people
Central American and Caribbean Games medalists in tennis
Central American and Caribbean Games gold medalists for Mexico
Tennis players at the 1967 Pan American Games
Medalists at the 1967 Pan American Games
Pan American Games silver medalists for Mexico
Pan American Games medalists in tennis
Miami Hurricanes men's tennis players